The Lausanne Métro Line M1, is a light rail metro line which links Lausanne-Flon, in the centre of Lausanne, to Renens, to the west of the agglomeration. The line serves an important purpose as it goes through the Lausanne campus, making it a crucial transport method for students accessing their university. In 2013, its ridership was 13.2 million, making it the lesser-used line of the Lausanne Métro at this time.

The line opened in 1991, and was branded TSOL until 2000 when it was rebranded to its current name to prepare the system for the second metro line.

History

Route
The line goes from Lausanne-Flon to Renens.

Stations

Fleet

To run the service, the line was equipped with a set of modern Light Rail Vehicles (LRVs), which run using electricity supplied via an overhead live wire and can be run singly or in multiple units, with each formation needing a driver.

There are a total of 18 of these original LRVs on the line, but after 20 years in service they were showing their age, and 2 were regularly out of use. Additionally, the line has been a victim of its own success, with 12.5 million passengers carried in 2012 and the line carrying the equivalent to the entire population of Yverdon-les-Bains every day.

In 2011, the Canton of Vaud gave 34 million Swiss Francs to enable the existing LRVs to have a mid-life refurbishment, and to permit the operator to commission MOB to build 5 brand-new LRVs. Previously, it was physically impossible for all trains to operate with a double formation, but the additional vehicles will enable the line to operate a full double-car service on all 10 peak-hour trains. In order to accommodate the new trains, the depot at Ecublens has been enlarged and additional servicing facilities built.

The first of the new LRVs was finished in July 2013 and was taken to the Ecublens depot in three distinct pieces: one half of the car body, the other half body, and the underframes and bogies. The operator was left to complete final assembly, and the new car entered service in December 2013. It is expected that the full fleet will be in service by 2015, permitting a 5-minute interval service of double-length trains.

All trams are high floor, fully air conditioned, can run high speed. Each tram has two cars, and in peak hours, two trams are often coupled for high capacity. It takes electricity via pantograph.

Features

The line is generally single track. At most stations a passing loop is provided to allow trains to pass, and a dedicated platform is provided for each direction. Exceptions to this are Bassenges, UNIL-Sorge and Provence stations, where the line is still single track serving one bidirectional platform.

The entire Lausanne Modern tram network is hybrid type. It partly runs underground, partly runs on unreserved segregated track with raised rail with granite stones like mainline railway which is completely separated from other vehicles, and partly on elevated track.

Alignment and Interchanges

The modern tram route is completely on segregated rail track, with both underground and elevated sections. So it offers a smooth and high speed service, due to no disturbances of road traffic.

Interchanges become with Lausanne Metro and Lausanne Light Rail at Lausanne-Flon, and with suburban rail at Renens.

See also
Trams in Lausanne - the first generation tramway network
Lausanne Metro
Lausanne-Echallens-Bercher railway

Notes and references

External links
 Official Website including both metro and tram - Transports Lausannois (TL) 

Tram
Tram transport in Switzerland
600 V DC railway electrification
Town tramway systems by city
Railway lines opened in 1991
1991 establishments in Switzerland